Franz Leopold Neumann (23 May 1900 – 2 September 1954) was a German political activist, Western Marxist theorist and labor lawyer, who became a political scientist in  exile and is best known for his theoretical analyses of National Socialism. He  studied in Germany and the United Kingdom, and spent the last phase of his career in the United States, where he worked for the Office of Strategic Services from 1943 to 1945. During the Second World War, Neumann spied for the Soviet Union under the code-name "Ruff". Together with Ernst Fraenkel and Arnold Bergstraesser, Neumann is considered to be among the founders of modern political science in the Federal Republic of Germany.

Biography

Early life

Neumann was born in to a Jewish family on May 23, 1900, in Kattowitz (Katowice), Silesia, German Empire (present day Poland). As a student Neumann supported the German November revolution of 1918 and joined the Social Democratic Party (SPD). Neumann was instrumental in organizing the Socialist Students Society in Frankfurt am Main, where in 1918 he met Leo Löwenthal, a future colleague in the Institute for Social Research in New York under Max Horkheimer. At Breslau (the present-day Wrocław in Poland), Leipzig, Rostock, and Frankfurt am Main, Neumann studied law and earned a doctorate in 1923 with a thesis on method in the theory of punishment. His main aim was to explain the socialist acceptance of liberal individualism in this sphere, in contradiction to Socialist theory. In the academic exercise that earned his degree, he did not actually attempt the sociological study he saw as necessary but addressed preliminary philosophical issues in the neo-Kantian debates of the day. However, his treatment of value philosophy led him to the conclusion that the antithetical liberal and socialist arguments were equally valid, and that the Socialist deviations from consistency in the matter of punishment was politically justifiable and subject only to political management. This most abstruse exercise, accordingly, foretells his lifelong reliance on negotiated settlements even if they involved exceptions from theoretical consistency. The trick was to take care that the effects of such deviations are not cumulative—as he came to conclude about the Socialist movement's compromises in Weimar.

Labor law and social democracy
Neumann was active from 1925 to 1927 as law clerk and assistant of Hugo Sinzheimer, the foremost reformist labor law theorist, who also engaged him as a teacher at the trade union academy affiliated with the University of Frankfurt. Throughout the Weimar years, Neumann's political commitment was to the labor wing of the Social Democratic Party. From 1928 to 1933 he worked in Berlin in partnership with Ernst Fraenkel as an attorney specializing in labor law, representing trade unions and publishing briefs and articles, and a technical book in this innovative field. In 1932–33 he became lead attorney for the Social Democratic Party and published a brief, itself suppressed by the Nazis, against the suppression of the principal Social Democratic newspaper.

In the weeks after the assumption of power by the National Socialists, Neumann was warned of his imminent arrest and he fled to England. There he studied under Harold Laski at the London School of Economics, and with the former Frankfurt sociology professor, Karl Mannheim. He earned a second doctorate with a study of the rise and fall of the historical epoch of the rule of law. On Laski's recommendation, Neumann was employed by the Frankfurt Institute of Social Research (in exile at Columbia University in New York City after some years in Geneva and Paris) in 1936, initially as administrator and legal advisor, and later as research associate, although he was never as well established in the group led by the Director, Max Horkheimer, as Friedrich Pollock and Theodor Adorno. He participated in the Institute's debates about national socialism in the New York years. His well-known study of the Nazi regime, however, was written without the scrutiny of the Institute's review procedures. Neumann played an important part in helping the Institute to secure the backing of the American Jewish Committee for its well-known study of anti-Semitism.

American exile 

Neumann achieved his academic reputation among American scholars with the publication of Behemoth: The Structure and Practice of National Socialism in 1942. The thesis is that National Socialist rule is a function of struggles among power groups united only by their hatred of the labor movement and that Nazi Germany consequently lacks a state in the sense of the modern political formation oriented to order and predictability. Within this framework, Neumann applied many Marxist tools of analysis to characterize the prime social component in the inner struggle. Behemoth made a major impact on the young sociologist C. Wright Mills.  While opinions differed about his theses, his mastery of German sources and rich empirical documentation drew applause from established American political scientists and the book prepared the way for his later university career.

The reception of Behemoth laid the foundation for Neumann's wartime career in Washington after the Institute's leadership declared itself financially unable to retain his services. Until the first months of 1943, Neumann served as a part-time consultant to the Board of Economic Warfare, staffing routine studies of trade patterns. He then became deputy head of the Central European Section of the Research and Analysis Branch of the OSS, amid numerous younger American professors, seconded to Washington for the duration. The position also allowed him to place a number of his Institute associates, who had been made redundant by the core group around Horkheimer. Neumann was instrumental in producing intelligence reports on the Nazis for the OSS, later published in a single volume Secret Reports on Nazi Germany: The Frankfurt School Contribution to the War Effort.

Neumann's friend, Paul Massing, a Soviet spy, reported to Moscow that Neumann had told him that he had produced a study of the Soviet economy for the OSS's Russian Department.  In April 1943, Elizabeth Zarubina, a Soviet spy in the United States, and the wife of Vassily Zarubin, met with Neumann: "(Zarubina) met for the first time with (Neumann) who promised to pass us all the data coming through his hands. According to (Neumann), he is getting many copies of reports from American ambassadors... and has access to materials referring to Germany." Neumann's code name was "Ruff".

Franz Neumann promised to cooperate fully during his initial meeting with Zarubina, after becoming a naturalized American citizen later that year he appeared to become reluctant to pass secret information. One memorandum sent to Moscow in early January 1944 described a conversation between Neumann and his friends Paul and Hede Massing, in which they "directly asked him about the reasons for his ability to work" and tried to determine whether he had changed his mind. Neumann responded: "I did not change my mind. If there is something really important, I will inform you without hesitation."

Neumann, Herbert Marcuse and Otto Kirchheimer worked on numerous projects, including the analysis of political tendencies in Germany. They were "specifically assigned to the identification of Nazi and anti-Nazi groups and individuals; the former were to be held accountable in the war crimes adjudication then being negotiated between the four Great Powers, and the latter were to be called upon for cooperation in post-war reconstruction. For his source materials he drew upon official and military intelligence reports, extensive OSS interviews with refugees, and special OSS agents and contacts in occupied Europe; it was his duty to evaluate the reliability of each of the items of intelligence that reached him, and assemble them all into a coherent analysis of points of strength and weakness in the Reich." (Katz, 1980:116). At the end of 1944, Neumann, Marcuse, and Kirchheimer were involved in preparing materials for use by eventual occupation authorities, including a De-nazification Guide. Most of this effort was rendered irrelevant by the priorities of the incipient Cold War policy at the end of the war. Neumann was detached from Washington Service until September 1945, to assist the head of OSS in preparing for the War Crimes Prosecutions. Just before the beginning of the trials, Neumann returned to Washington, to take up a position on the Central European Desk of the Department of State.

Nuremberg, Berlin, New York 

In the service of the Nuremberg War Crimes Tribunal under the Chief Prosecutor, Justice Robert H. Jackson, Neumann prepared analyses of the twenty two Nuremberg defendants and of various Nazi organizations. From mid-September 1945, Neumann's team prepared and supervised materials for a series of indictments with other OSS colleagues responsible for both interrogation and document analysis. William Joseph Donovan initially directed Neumann to examine religious persecution other than against Jews under the Nazi regime. The report's analysis of "the problem of establishing criminal responsibility" contributed to the prosecutorial strategy. The thinking was to show that measures taken against the Christian churches were an integral part of National Socialism. It also attempted to show that measures were criminal from the standpoint of German or international law, depending where a given act was committed. The report claimed key articles of the Weimar Constitution "were never formally abrogated by the National Socialist regime, … were left untouched and still remain theoretically in force."  Furthermore, "respect for the principle of religious freedom" continued to be reiterated in various official policy statements of the Nazi regime, and in various "enactments of the National Socialist state, particularly the Concordat of 20 July 1933."

The material on religious persecution is placed in the wider context of how these agencies committed crimes against humanity as an integral part of the Nazi's master plan, its conspiracy to seize and consolidate ideological control and totalitarian power within Germany by eradicating sources of actual and potential opposition. This material formed part of the evidence on which these agencies were judged to be criminal organisations. Neumann's group wrote,

The emphasis on the persecution of Christian churches rather than on the far more destructive actions against Jews was a matter of strategic and political decision by the four-party prosecution.

Neumann also took charge of revising the first draft prosecution brief detailing the personal responsibility of Hermann Göring, the most senior defendant. Neuman believed that German war criminals should be tried before German courts according to Weimar law as an important part of the wider de-nazification effort.

Like other disillusioned veterans of the Weimar Social Democratic Party, Neumann hoped for a more radical and more unified labor and socialist movement in the immediate post-war period, but he quickly accepted the view shared among his old party associates in Berlin that the Communists' subservience to the Soviet Union required the Social Democratic Party to pursue an independent course. No one has ever suggested that there was any connection between the actions that led to his being quite possibly the person mentioned in the well-known Venona Papers as a Soviet "spy" for some months during 1944 and any of his writings or public acts. What evidence there is suggests that at most Neumann found it important for political reasons that had little to do with Soviet designs to give them knowledge of certain events or happenings. At the time, he was especially well informed on possible American dealings with elements in German religious, military and economic circles who were interested in a separate peace.

In 1948 Neumann became a professor of political science at Columbia University and helped establish the Free University of Berlin. Neumann was highly regarded at Columbia and played a prominent part in attempts by the Rockefeller Foundation to strengthen political theory as a component of political science in American universities. He published several seminal articles arising out of his attempts to develop a democratic theory consonant with modern political and social changes. Although this project remained unfinished, he contributed important studies of the concepts of dictatorship, power and freedom. The study of modern dictatorships, he contended, revealed the dangers to democracy arising from the pervasive anxiety incident to modern society and showed the need, first, to approach the problem of power from the positive standpoint he thought implicit in the tradition of Rousseau (not liberal fears), and, second, to recognize that freedom entailed rational knowledge of social realities and a mental sense of empowerment (what the older moral philosophy called 'active virtue'), as well as a sphere of protected personal, social (communications), and political (status activus) rights. As with Behemoth, the force of Neumann's argument depended as much on the richness and realism of his political diagnoses as on the contestable theses he put forward.

Neumann died in an automobile accident in Visp, Switzerland, on September 2, 1954. His widow, Inge Werner, married his closest friend and intellectual companion, Herbert Marcuse, in 1955. Franz's oldest son, Osha Thomas Neumann, is a prominent civil rights attorney in Berkeley, California. Michael Neumann, his younger son, is a logician and radical political philosopher, and is a professor emeritus of philosophy at Trent University in Peterborough, Ontario.

Selected bibliography

English

German

 (German trans. of the 1936 doctoral dissertation, 'The Governance of the Rule of Law: an Investigation into the Relationship between the Political Theories, the Legal System, and the Social Background in the Competitive Society,' London School of Economics, 1936)

See also
 Frankfurt School

References

Footnotes

Works cited 
Mattias Iser and David Strecker,  Franz L. Neumann: Power Constitution, Critique Constellations 10.2.(June 2003)
Barry M. Katz, The Criticism of Arms:  The Frankfurt School Goes to War.  Journal of Modern History 59 (September 1987).
Barry M. Katz, Foreign Intelligence (Cambridge, MA: Harvard University Press, 1989).
Contested Legacies: Political Theory and the Hitler Regime.  Special Issue of the European Journal of Political Theory, III.2 (2004).
David Kettler, Domestic Regimes, the Rule of Law, and Democratic Social Change. (Mobility and Norm Change Vol. 3). Berlin and Cambridge MA: Galda & Wilch Glienecke 2001.
Michael Neumann, The Rule of Law. Politicizing Ethics. Ashgate New Critical Thinking in Philosophy. 2002.
Rolf Wiggershaus, The Frankfurt School, Cambridge, Mass., MIT Press, 1994.
European War Crimes Trials: A Bibliography, compiled and annotated by Inge S. Neumann. Additional material furnished by the Wiener Library, London. Edited by Robert A. Rosenbaum. Publisher: New York, Carnegie Endowment for International Peace, 1951.
Martin Jay, The Dialectical Imagination. A History of the Frankfurt School and the Institute of Social Research 1923-1950. Little Brown and Company, Canada. 1973. 
C.Wright Mills, Power, Politics and People. New York, 1963.
William E. Scheuerman, The Rule of Law under Siege, Berkeley CA: University of California Press 1996.
Allen Weinstein and Alexander Vassiliev, The Haunted Wood: Soviet Espionage in America—the Stalin Era (New York: Random House, 1999), pgs. 249-51, 254, 261.

External links 

The Cold War International History Project (CWIHP) has the full text of former KGB agent Alexander Vassiliev's Notebooks containing new evidence on Neumann's cooperation with the Soviet Union.
C. Wright Mills,About Neumann and Behemoth in Power, Politics and People
Inge S. Neumann
Franz Neumann page, created by Harold Marcuse
Franz Neumann Project
Manfred Funke: Franz L. Neumanns Behemoth-Die erste Strukturanalyse des Drittes Reich
Brig. Gen. John Magruder (Director of the Strategic Services Unit) to McCloy (Assistant Secretary of War, Department of War), Strategic Services Unit as of 1 October 1945, Washington, October 9, 1945 CIA Historical Files, HS/HC-265, (on file with the Rutgers Journal of Law and Religion).
Claire Hulme & Michael Salter, The Nazi's Persecution as a War Crime: The OSS Response Within the Nuremeberg Trial's Process, Rutgers Journal of Law and Religion, n.d.
Forced Migration and Scientific Change : Émigré German-Speaking Scientists and Scholars after 1933, German Historical Institute, Mitchell G. Ash, Ed. (2002). 
Bruce Cummings, Boundary Displacement: Area Studies and International Studies during and after the Cold War, Bulletin of Concerned Asian Scholars, 1993.  
 Michael Salter, Neo-Fascist Legal Theory on Trial: An Interpretation of Carl Schmitt's Defence at Nuremberg from a Perspective of Franz Neumann's Critical Theory of Law  
Jeffrey Herf, The "Jewish War", Holocaust and Genocide Studies, Vol. 19, No. 1. (2005). 
David Kettler: Studies of F.L. Neumann.  

William Scheuermann's review of 'The Frankfurt School at War'. 

1900 births
1954 deaths
People from Katowice
People from the Province of Silesia
American spies for the Soviet Union
American people in the Venona papers
German sociologists
German political scientists
Columbia University faculty
Jewish emigrants from Nazi Germany to the United Kingdom
German male writers
Jewish socialists
Alumni of the London School of Economics
Frankfurt School
International Military Tribunal in Nuremberg
World War II spies for the Soviet Union
People of the Office of Strategic Services
20th-century political scientists